Jennifer Burcu Düner (born 20 August 1979), aka Jennifer Düner in Germany and Burcu Düner in Turkey, is a German-born Turkish former football midfielde. After playing in German clubs she moved to Turkey. Lately she played in the Turkish Women's Second League for Bursa Sağlıkgücü Gençlikspor with jersey number 13. She was a member of the Turkish national team in 2010.

Career

Club
Jennifer Düner played in Germany for the Frauen-Bundesliga clubs FFC Flaesheim-Hillen (1999–2001), FFC Heike Rheine (2001–2004) and SG Wattenscheid 09 (2007–2008) in the forward position.

She received her license in Turkey on 4 February 2009 from Sakarya Yenikent Güneşspor, where she played until October that year. For the 2009–10 season, Burcu Düner transferred to Bursa Sağlıkgücü Gençlikspor. There, she played two seasons.

International
Jennifer Düner made her international debut in the Germany U-19 team at the UEFA Under-19 European Championship play-off match against Poland on 14 October 1997.

Burcu Düner was called up to the Turkey national team, and debuted in the 2011 FIFA World Cup qualification – UEFA Group 5 match against Malta on 27 March 2010. She capped one more time at the same tournament.

Career statistics

References

1979 births
People from Menden (Sauerland)
Sportspeople from Arnsberg (region)
German people of Turkish descent
German women's footballers
FFC Heike Rheine players
Women's association football forwards
Turkish women's footballers
Women's association football midfielders
Turkey women's international footballers
Living people
Footballers from North Rhine-Westphalia
Association football midfielders
Association football forwards
Germany women's international footballers